"A Soldier's Rosary" is a 1918 song composed by Joseph A. Burke with lyrics by J. E. Dempsey. The 1918 publication, by the A. J. Stasny Music Co., featured a cover illustration by E. E. Walton.

The song tells of a mother exhorting her soldier son to remember to say his nightly prayers, while the singer comforts the mother with the thought that the soldier's actions are all the prayer he needs, saying "He serves his maker when he serves his country's needs." The song compares the bullets of war to the beads on the rosary, and the soldier's ultimate death is concluded as "a soldier's rosary".

Analysis
In Born in the U.S.A.: The Myth of American Popular Music from Colonial Times, Timothy Sheurer argues that "A Soldier's Rosary" perpetuates the American myth of divine destiny, that the American ideal serves a higher purpose. By equating the soldier's actions with prayer, his ultimate death is given higher purpose.

References

Further reading
Parker, Bernard S. World War I Sheet Music:9,670 Patriotic Songs Published in the United States, 1914–1920,with More Than 600 Covers Illustrated. Jefferson, N.C.: McFarland, 2007.  
Scheurer, Timothy E. Born in the U.S.A.: The Myth of America in Popular Music from Colonial Times to the Present. Jackson: University Press of Mississippi, 1991.    
Vogel, Frederick G. World War I Songs: A History and Dictionary of Popular American Patriotic Tunes, with Over 300 Complete Lyrics. Jefferson, N.C.: McFsrland & Co., 1995.  
Whalan, Mark. American Culture in the 1910s. Edinburgh: Edinburgh University Press, 2010.

External links
  Listen to an MP3 and see the sheet music

Songs about soldiers
Songs about the military
1918 songs
Songs of World War I
Songs with music by Joe Burke (composer)